I'm So Blue may refer to:

"I'm So Blue", song by Melanie from Photograph (Melanie album)
I'm So Blue (Michael Jackson song)
"I'm So Blue", song written by Randy Sharp
"I'm So Blue", song by Katie Thompson